This is a list of amphibians and reptiles found on the island of Saint Vincent, located in the Caribbean Lesser Antilles.  It is the main island of the nation Saint Vincent and the Grenadines.

Amphibians
There are four species of amphibian on Saint Vincent, one of which was introduced.  One species, Eleutherodactylus shrevei, is endemic.

Frogs (Anura)

Reptiles
Including marine turtles and introduced species, there are 16 reptile species reported on Saint Vincent, three of which are endemic.

Turtles (Testudines)

Lizards and snakes (Squamata)

Crocodilians (Crocodylia)

See also
List of amphibians and reptiles of the Grenadines

Notes

References
Note: All species listed above are supported by Malhotra & Thorpe 1999, unless otherwise cited.

.

Saint Vincent
Saint Vincent
 Saint Vincent
Saint Vincent